Never Come Undone is an EP by La Dispute and Koji, released on May 3, 2011, by No Sleep Records. This is the second split EP for both bands. The EP has one new song from each band, as well as a reimagining of "Last Blues for Bloody Knuckles" by La Dispute and a cover of Ted Leo and the Pharmacists's "Biomusicology" by Koji. The vinyl press was limited to 2,000 copies; 500 purple and black, 500 purple and 1,000 black.

Track listing

Personnel
La Dispute
Jordan Dreyer - lead vocals, lyrics
Brad Vander Lugt - drums, keyboards, percussion
Chad Sterenberg - guitar
Kevin Whittemore - guitar
Adam Vass - bass guitar, additional guitars

Koji
Andrew Koji Shiraki - lead vocals, lyrics, guitar

References

2011 EPs
La Dispute (band) EPs
Split EPs
No Sleep Records albums